Marégraphe Island is a small rocky island 100 meters west of the north end of Carrel Island in the Géologie Archipelago, Antarctica. It was charted in 1951 by the French Antarctic Expedition and so named by them because a recording tide gauge, or marigraph (in French "marégraphe"), was placed on the island and obtained data during 1951 and 1952.

See also 
 List of Antarctic and sub-Antarctic islands

References

Islands of Adélie Land